Cross Roads is an unincorporated community in western Stone County, Missouri, United States. It is located at the intersection of State Routes 173 and 248, approximately four miles west of Galena.  Crossroads is part of the Branson, Missouri Micropolitan Statistical Area.

References

Unincorporated communities in Stone County, Missouri
Branson, Missouri micropolitan area
Unincorporated communities in Missouri